Andrew Sabin Hodgson (born 16 September 1941) is a former New Zealand born South African cricketer. Hodgson was a right-handed batsman who bowled right-arm medium pace.

Hodgson made his first-class debut for Western Province in 1967 against South African Universities. From 1967 to 1968 he played 6 first-class matches for Western Province, with his final first-class match coming against Natal B. In his 6 matches for the Province he took 10 wickets at a bowling average of 32.90, with best figures of 4/50.

In 1973 Hodgson made his debut for Dorset in the 1973 Minor Counties Championship against Cornwall. During the same season Hodgson made his List-A debut for Dorset against Staffordshire in the Gillette Cup, where he took a single wicket in the match. This was Hodgson's only List-A appearance. Hodgson played infrequently for Dorset in the Minor Counties Championship, playing 11 matches for Dorset from 1973 to 1980, with his final match for the county coming against Devon.

External links
 
 Andrew Hodgson at CricketArchive

1941 births
Living people
Cricketers from Auckland
South African cricketers
Western Province cricketers
Dorset cricketers